Yakokut is a rural locality (a selo), one of four settlements, in addition to the Urban-type settlements of Leninsky, the administrative centre of the settlement, and Lebediny, and the village of Orochen 1-y in the Leninsky Urban Settlement of Aldansky District in the Sakha Republic, Russia. Its population as of the 2010 Census was 111; down from 150 recorded in the 2002 Census.

References

Notes

Sources
Official website of the Sakha Republic. Registry of the Administrative-Territorial Divisions of the Sakha Republic. Aldansky District. 

Rural localities in Aldansky District